San Lorenzo is a barrio in the municipality of Morovis, Puerto Rico. San Lorenzo has six sectors and its population in 2010 was 1,209.

History
Puerto Rico was ceded by Spain in the aftermath of the Spanish–American War under the terms of the Treaty of Paris of 1898 and became an unincorporated territory of the United States. In 1899, the United States Department of War conducted a census of Puerto Rico finding that the population of San Lorenzo barrio was 884.

Clandestine car races took place in San Lorenzo for many years until an accident on July 18, 1998, claimed the lives of five people. Legal action was taken against police for not having stopped the races from occurring. The races had been very popular, with 5,000 to 6,000 spectators on hand, until they were ended.

San Lorenzo in Morovis was one of the areas of Puerto Rico heavily impacted by Hurricane Maria on September 20, 2017, with washed away bridges and loss of power for months.

San Lorenzo was left isolated when Hurricane Maria washed away their main bridge with the PR-567 highway, into and out of the barrio. An old highway which sits directly on the waters of the river is sometimes passable albeit dangerous. The old road always being washed by the river, was at times passable and was being used by residents, (including school buses), until the construction of a temporary bridge was completed in April, 2018. The alternative to traversing the bridge, or the old highway over the river, is an hour-long drive.

The construction of a bridge for the isolated community was completed in April 2018 and the bridge was named  (Hope) in 2019.

Geography
San Lorenzo barrio is south of Torrecillas, west of Morovis Sur and Río Grande and north of Pasto and Vaga barrios. San Lorenzo's west border is with the municipality of Ciales.

Sectors

Barrios (which are roughly comparable to minor civil divisions) in turn are further subdivided into smaller local populated place areas/units called sectores (sectors in English). The types of sectores may vary, from normally sector to urbanización to reparto to barriada to residencial, among others.

The following sectors are in San Lorenzo barrio:

, and  
.

Gallery

See also

 List of communities in Puerto Rico

References

External links
 
 

Barrios of Morovis, Puerto Rico